Arboga is a locality and the seat of Arboga Municipality in Västmanland County, Sweden with 10,330 inhabitants in 2010.

Overview
The city of Arboga is known to have existed as a town since the 13th century but the area has been inhabited since around 900 AD.  The name (originally  Arbugæ) consists of the two words "Ar" which in ancient Swedish means river and bughi which means "bend" and which together have the meaning "river bend".

The city was at one time a residence of the royal family of Vasa. It was the scene of church assemblies and national diets, and it is known for the antiquities in its neighborhood. The first session of the Riksdag of the Estates was held in Arboga in 1435. Albertus Pictor, the most famous Swedish artist of the late medieval period, was admitted burgher of the town in 1465.

Today the city is an important traffic link since the highways E18 and E20 merge there. Two railways Mälarbanan and Svealandsbanan, between Stockholm and Hallsberg also merge in Arboga. The city has a population of about 
14,350 (2016).

Events
Bands like Bring Me the Horizon, Arch Enemy, Architects, and Dimmu Borgir recorded albums with Fredrik Nordström in his own recording studio Studio Fredman. Recently, the studio was relocated to Gothenburg.

Sports
The following sports clubs are in Arboga:
 Arboga Södra IF
 IFK Arboga IK
In addition the Sixth Women's World Gliding Championships was held 15–25 June 2011.

Alexander Gustafsson, mixed martial artist, was born in Arboga.

References

External links

 
Municipal seats of Västmanland County
Swedish municipal seats
Populated places in Västmanland County
Populated places in Arboga Municipality
Cities in Västmanland County

fi:Arbogan kunta